Sagar Sarhadi (11 May 1933 – 22 March 2021) was an Indian short story and play writer, and a writer, director and producer for film. Born in Baffa (then in British India and now in Pakistan), he began writing Urdu short stories and then continued as an Urdu playwright. Sagar Sarhadi was Honored with Lifetime Achievement Award at ICA - International Cultural Artifact Film Festival in 2019 by Ashghar Wajahat.

He became popular in films with Yash Chopra's Kabhi Kabhi (1976), starring Amitabh Bachchan and Raakhee. He went on to write for films including Noorie (1979); Silsila (1981) starring Shashi Kapoor, Amitabh Bachchan, Jaya Bhaduri and Rekha; Chandni (1989) starring Rishi Kapoor, Sridevi and Vinod Khanna; Faasle starring Sunil Dutt, Rekha, Farooq Shaikh and Deepti Naval; Rang (1993) starring Kamal Sadanah and Divya Bharti and directed by Talat Jani; Anubhav starring Sanjeev Kumar and Tanuja and directed by Basu Bhattacharya; Zindagi (1976); The Other Man; Karmayogi; Kaho Naa... Pyaar Hai; Karobaar; Bazaar; Chausar and became a well known name as a scriptwriter.

Filmography 
Goonj (1974) --(Dialogues)
 Alingan (1974) --(Dialogues)
Kabhi Kabhi (1976 film) (screenplay/dialogue) starring Amitabh Bachchan and Raakhee 
Noorie (1979 film) (screenplay/dialogue) starring Farooq Sheikh and Poonam Dhillon 
Chandni (translation: "Moonlight") (1989 film) (dialogue) starring Rishi Kapoor, Sridevi and Vinod Khanna 
Silsila (translation: "The Affair") (1981 film) (screenplay) starring Shashi Kapoor, Amitabh Bachchan, Jaya Bhaduri and Rekha
Bazaar (1982 film) (direction) starring Naseeruddin Shah, Farooq Sheikh, Smita Patil, Supriya Pathak and Bharat Kapoor
Faasle (translation: "Distance") (1995 film) (dialogue) starring Sunil Dutt, Rekha, Farooq Shaikh and Deepti Naval

References

External links
 

2021 deaths
1933 births
20th-century Indian dramatists and playwrights
20th-century Indian male writers
20th-century Indian short story writers
Indian male screenwriters
Hindi-language film directors
People from Abbottabad District
Urdu-language film directors